Louise Mirrer, Ph.D., is president and CEO of the New-York Historical Society. Under Mirrer’s direction, the New-York Historical Society has launched a series of exhibitions, including Slavery in New York; New York Divided: Slavery and the Civil War; A New Light on Tiffany: Clara Driscoll and the Tiffany Girls; French Founding Father: Lafayette’s Return to Washington’s America; Grant and Lee in War and Peace; Lincoln and New York, Nueva York and a rich array of intellectually engaging lectures, debates and family programs. Mirrer inaugurated the Saturday Academy, an American history enhancement program for high-school students, and a new Graduate Institute on Constitutional History. Mirrer also led the Historical Society’s 100-million-dollar campaign for a major renovation of its landmark building on Central Park West, creating new permanent installation galleries and a children's history museum. Mirrer also oversaw efforts to create a Center for Women's History, which opened in the Fall of 2016.

Biography
She earned a Ph.D. in the Spanish language and a Ph.D. in Humanities from Stanford University.

She was the Executive Vice Chancellor for Academic Affairs at the City University of New York.

She was named president of the New-York Historical Society in 2004.

Honors
Merrill Award for Outstanding Contributions to Liberal Arts Education, ACTA, 2014; Woman of Distinction Medal, League of Women Voters (2007); Dean’s Medal, CUNY Honors College (2005); Education and Student Advocacy Award, Hostos Community College (2005); President’s Medal, CUNY Graduate Center, 2004; Leadership Award, Asian-American Research Institution, 2003; New York Post’s “50 Most Influential Women in New York,” 2003; Citation of Honor, Queens Borough President’s Office, 2001; Women Making History Award, Queensborough Community College, 2001; and the YWCA “Women Achievers” Award, 2000. In 2007 she was made an Honorary Fellow of Wolfson College, Cambridge.

References

External links
About Louise Mirrer, nyhistory.org
Louise Mirrer, Huffington Post

21st-century American historians
21st-century American male writers
Directors of museums in the United States
Women museum directors
Stanford University alumni
Living people
American women historians
New-York Historical Society
21st-century American women writers
Year of birth missing (living people)
American male non-fiction writers